Ingogo is a locality some 25 km north of Newcastle, site of a battle on 8 February 1881, during the First Anglo-Boer War, in which British casualties numbered 76 while Boer losses amounted to 8. The name is derived from that of the Ngogo River. The form iNgogo has been approved.

References

Populated places in the Newcastle Local Municipality